Slaugham is a village and civil parish in the Mid Sussex District of West Sussex, England. At the 2001 census it had a population of 2,226 persons of whom 1,174 were economically active. At the 2011 Census the parish included the villages of Handcross and Warninglid and had a population of 2,769. In addition the parish contains the settlement of Pease Pottage.

St Mary's Church is a Grade II* listed building dating mostly from the 12th and 13th centuries and is situated opposite Slaugham's village green. It serves all four villages. Church Covert wood off Staplefied Road is managed by the Woodland Trust.

References

Bibliography

External links

St Mary's Church

Villages in West Sussex
Mid Sussex District